Barry McGuire (born October 15, 1935) is an American singer-songwriter primarily known for his 1965 hit "Eve of Destruction". Later he would pioneer as a singer and songwriter of Contemporary Christian music.

Early life
McGuire was born in Oklahoma City and his family moved to California when he was two years old. After working as a commercial fisherman, and then going on to become a journeyman pipe fitter, McGuire got a job singing in a bar. In 1961, he released his first single called "The Tree", which was not a hit.

He formed a duo with Barry Kane (d. 2013) called Barry & Barry. They performed original folk songs at The Ice House, a small folk club in Pasadena, California before moving on to The Troubadour in Hollywood in the spring of 1962. There they joined The New Christy Minstrels, a large folk group, and McGuire later sang lead vocals on their novelty single "Three Wheels on My Wagon".

They continued to perform their separate duo act there as well as performing with The New Christy Minstrels. Under Horizon Records, they cut their first and only album as Barry & Barry, titled Here And Now, which contained songs such as "Gold Wedding Ring", "Land Of Odin", the single "Another Man", "Summer's Over", "You Know My Name", "Bull 'Gine Run", and "Far Side of the Hill". It also included "If I Had A Hammer", released three months after the release of the same song by folk trio Peter, Paul and Mary.

In 1963, McGuire, along with Randy Sparks (the founder of The New Christy Minstrels), co-wrote and sang lead vocal on the Christys' first and biggest hit single: Green, Green. He left the Christys in January 1965, after recording the album Cowboys and Indians, although, on the 1965 album Chim Chim Cher-ee, he sang on the title cut.

Solo career
As a solo folk rock singer in the 1960s, he was best known for his hit "Eve of Destruction", and "Sins of a Family", both written by P.F. Sloan. McGuire's other chart successes were "Child of Our Times" and "Cloudy Summer Afternoon (Raindrops)" (penned by Travis Edmonson of the 1960s folk-duo, Bud & Travis). "Eve of Destruction" sold over one million copies, and was awarded a gold disc. The album, Eve of Destruction, peaked at No. 37 on the Billboard 200 album chart during the week ending September 25, 1965. That same week the single went to No. 1 on both the Cashbox and Billboard Hot 100 chart. McGuire was never again to break into the Top 40. The song knocked "Help!" by The Beatles out of the top spot on the chart. According to McGuire, "Eve of Destruction" was recorded in one take on a Thursday morning (from words scrawled on a crumpled piece of paper) and then he got a call from the record company at 7:00 the next Monday morning, telling him to turn on the radio – his song was playing. The recording includes an "ahhh" where McGuire could not read the words. The Temptations referenced McGuire's song "Eve of Destruction" in their song "Ball of Confusion (That's What the World Is Today)".

The album This Precious Time was released in February 1966, his second with Dunhill Records. It includes a version of "California Dreamin with The Mamas & the Papas singing backing vocals. McGuire is mentioned several times in The Mamas & the Papas hit "Creeque Alley". Frank Zappa wrote McGuire's name in the sleeve of his Freak Out! album (1966) as one of his musical influences. 

McGuire appeared in the 1967 movie The President's Analyst with James Coburn as the character "Old Wrangler"(leader of a band which completely comprised the Los Angeles group Clear Light, who were between lead vocalists) and in Werewolves on Wheels in 1971. He also starred for a year in the Broadway musical Hair in 1968.

McGuire became a born-again Christian in 1971 after a brief encounter with evangelist Arthur Blessitt in October 1970. In 1973, he joined the Myrrh label and released the album Seeds. This album is also notable for the backing vocals provided by the family trio that would become known as the 2nd Chapter of Acts. In 1974, McGuire released his second Jesus music album Lighten Up, which included a remake of "Eve of Destruction". He toured with 2nd Chapter of Acts and "A Band Called David", and in 1975 this collaborative effort resulted in the double live album To the Bride.

In 1976, he left Myrrh, joining former Myrrh executive Billy Ray Hearn's new label, Sparrow Records. He recorded seven albums on Sparrow, the best known of which is Cosmic Cowboy, released in 1978 in which the title track hit No. 1 on the CCM Magazine's Contemporary charts and stayed there for 35 weeks. That year he also released a top-selling children's album Bullfrogs and Butterflies (part of the Agapeland series) for Sparrow's subsidiary label, Birdwing.

In 1978, he toured England, Scotland, and Wales with the Jimmy Owens' musical The Witness, in which he played the part of the apostle Peter, a part he also played on the studio recording of The Witness.

In 1985 McGuire was featured on the contemporary musical recording, "The Scroll", performing the character of Jesus. The musical was composed by Canadian singer, songwriter, Bruce Stacey and was recorded with the National Philharmonic in England. The musical also featured other contemporary Christian artists of the day. The Scroll was released on Light Records and was featured at three world exhibitions as a major multi-media presentation.

Later life

In the 1980s, after his final album Pilgrim, McGuire left the music industry, and settled for a time in New Zealand with his wife, Mari. He wrote music, performed and hosted the videos for several years for Gospel Light Publishing's Vacation Bible School Programs. He returned to the United States in the 1990s, teaming up with Terry Talbot and recording as Talbot McGuire. The duo released four albums between 1996 and 2000.

In 1990, he published a novel co-written with Logan White. A paperback, In the Midst of Wolves, told a story about a group of bikers who come to know God. He did a brief stint with The New Mamas and the Papas in 1997–1998.

In 2000, McGuire toured with Christian musician, John Michael Talbot.

As of 2006, he undertook engagements which include a few songs and talks on a mixture of topics, by both McGuire and his wife. The McGuires reside in Fresno, California, but also spend part of every year in New Zealand.

On March 12, 2008, McGuire appeared on the Australian music comedy/game show, Spicks and Specks, performing an updated version of "Eve of Destruction", with new lines such as, "You're old enough to kill / you just started voting" and "... can live for ten years in space". The reference to "Red China" was also removed. In 2009, McGuire released "Eve 2012", where the text had been modified to reflect contemporary problems (mostly environmental problems) rather than the problems of the 1960s.

In 2008, McGuire teamed up with former member of the Byrds, John York, for a live tour called "Trippin' the '60s", which McGuire describes as "taking the songs and the truth that was in those songs from the 1960s and bringing them into the present moment... It's not a cover pack, it's us singing songs that we sung with a lot of our friends that aren't around anymore to sing them."

In 2013, McGuire appeared in the documentary film 'The Byrd Who Flew Alone', produced by Four Suns Productions. The film was about Gene Clark, one of the original Byrds, who was a friend of McGuire's for many years.

Partial discography

Albums
1963: The Barry McGuire Album
1965: Eve of Destruction (No. 37. US)
1965: This Precious Time
1968: The World's Last Private Citizen
1971: McGuire and the Doctor
1972: Seeds
1974: Lighten Up
1974: Narnia
1975: Jubilation
1975: To the Bride
1975: Eve of Destruction (Star Power)
1976: C'mon Along
1976: Anyone But Jesus 
1976: Jubilation Two Headed Stranger
1977: Have You Heard1978: Cosmic Cowboy1979: Inside Out1980: The Polka Dot Bear - The Story of Creation1980: Best of Barry McGuire1981: Finer Than Gold1989: Pilgrim1991: Let's Tend God's Earth1995: When Dinosaurs Walked the Earth 
1997: Ancient Garden 
1999: Frost and Fire2000: Eve of Destruction (20 Inspirational Classics)''

Charting singles

See also
List of 1970s Christian pop artists
List of artists who reached number one on the Hot 100 (U.S.)
List of 1960s one-hit wonders in the United States
List of: Billboard Hot 100 number-one singles of 1965

References

External links
 
 Barry McGuire's "Trippin' the '60s" official site 
 Interview with Stain Free Media, November 16, 2007
 [ Barry McGuire biography] at Allmusic website
 
 TheBeginningsConcert.com – Reunion Concert Event.

1935 births
American folk singers
American male singer-songwriters
American performers of Christian music
American Christians
Dunhill Records artists
Era Records artists
Mira Records artists
Living people
Musicians from Fresno, California
Musicians from Oklahoma City
Singer-songwriters from Oklahoma
Singer-songwriters from California
The New Christy Minstrels members
The Mamas and the Papas members